Abetifi is a small town in south Ghana and is the capital of Kwahu East district, a district in the Eastern Region of south Ghana.

References

Populated places in the Eastern Region (Ghana)